Night Moves may refer to:

Music
 Night Moves (album), a 1976 album by Bob Seger & The Silver Bullet Band
 "Night Moves" (Bob Seger song), the title song
 "Night Moves" (Marilyn Martin song), 1986
 "Night Moves" (Abigail song), a 1996 single by Abigail
 Nightmoves, a 2007 album by Kurt Elling
 "Nightmoves", a song from Michael Franks' 1976 album The Art of Tea
 Night Moves, a 2002 album by Carolyn Breuer
 Night Moves (band), a rock band

Other media
 Night Moves (1975 film), a 1975 film directed by Arthur Penn and starring Gene Hackman
 Night Moves (2013 film), a 2013 film directed by Kelly Reichardt and starring  Dakota Fanning and Jesse Eisenberg
 "The Night Moves", an episode of The O.C.
 "Night Moves", an episode of War of the Worlds
 Night Moves, a novel in the series Tom Clancy's Net Force
 Night Moves and Other Stories (2000), a short story collection by Tim Powers
 Night Moves (adventure), for the role-playing game Marvel Super Heroes
 Night Moves (TV series), a Canadian TV show from 1986–1993
 Night Moves (poetry collection), a 2013 book by Stephanie Barber
 Night Moves (memoir), a 2018 memoir by music critic Jessica Hopper

See also 
 Knight Moves (disambiguation)